Torá may refer to:
 Torá language, an extinct language of Brazil
 Torà, known in Spanish as Torá, a town in Catalonia, Spain
 Torah, in Judaism

See also 
 Tora (disambiguation)